Saint George and the Dragon is a medieval legend.

Saint George and the Dragon may also refer to:

Paintings
 Saint George and the Dragon (Raphael), Washington, NGA, 1506, oil-on-wood
 St. George (Raphael, Louvre), also known as St. George and the Dragon, an oil-on-wood painting of c. 1504
 Saint George and the Dragon (Rubens), 1620s, oil-on-canvas
 Saint George and the Dragon (Martorell), 1434–1435, tempera-on-panel
 Saint George and the Dragon (Uccello), 1470, oil-on-canvas
 Saint George and the Dragon (Tintoretto), 1555 or 1558, oil-on-canvas
 St. George and the Dragon (Carpaccio), tempera-on-panel, 1504
 Saint George and the Dragon (Farleigh Hungerford Castle), between 1430 and 1445

Other media
 Saint George and the Dragon (Notke), a 15th-century wooden sculpture by Bernt Notke
 "St. George and the Dragon" (song), a 1979 rock song
 Saint George and the Dragon (book), a 1984 children's picture book

See also
 George and Dragon (disambiguation)
 George and the Dragon (disambiguation)
 "St. George and the Dragonet"
 St. George Shoots the Dragon
 :Category:Saint George and the Dragon
 St. George Dragons
 St. George Illawarra Dragons